Tribute Quartet is an American southern gospel quartet based in Nashville, Tennessee. It was founded by Gary Casto and Josh Singletary in 2006.

History 

In 2005 Jackie and Elaine Wilburn retired the Wilburn's and came off the road. Two of the remaining members, Gary Casto and Josh Singletary, formed Monument Quartet with Marshall Pugh and Dennis Dugger. Pugh was known for his time with Vestal Goodman and Dugger had previously sung with the Apostles. After their second project, in December 2006, Casto, Singletary and Dugger left and hired Jacob Kitson to form Tribute Quartet and were signed to BSA World Records.

In 2008, Tribute was named Absolutely Gospel Music's Breakthrough Artist of the Year, were voted the Horizon Group of the Year by readers of Singing News magazine and brought the first change for the quartet when Kitson left the group in June to join Greater Vision. He was replaced at the tenor position by Brian Alvey. In 2009 the group signed with Crossroads Music joining comparable artists such as the Kingdom Heirs and the Talley Trio.

After two years, Alvey left the group in June 2010 for a marketing and promotions job. After a short stint with the Voices of Lee, 18-year old Riley Harrison Clark was chosen to replace him. In early 2011 Dennis Dugger came off the road and was replaced by Anthony Davis as the new bass singer was.

In 2014 Tribute Quartet left the Crossroads Music Sonlite label and signed on with Daywind Records.

Their lineup remained the same until 2019, when Riley Harrison Clark left to pursue a solo career. He was replaced by tenor Gus Gaches, who has a long history in the Southern Gospel music spectrum, singing most notably with Legacy Five.

In early 2021, Tribute released a YouTube video announcing that Anthony Davis had left the group and that they had brought on a new bass singer. Several days ater, on February 11, 2021, Ian Owens was revealed as the new choice.

Tribute Quartet has made many appearances at the National Quartet Convention, Silver Dollar City, Dollywood, and on television networks such as Fox News, DayStar and TBN.

Members 
Current
 Gary Casto – lead (2006–present)
 Josh Singletary – baritone / piano (2006–present)
 Gus Gaches – tenor (2019–present)
 Ian Owens – bass (2021–present)

Former
 Anthony Davis – bass (2011–2020)
 Dennis Dugger – bass (2006–2011)
 Brian Alvey – tenor (2008–2010)
 Riley Harrison Clark – tenor (2010-2019)
 Jacob Kitson – tenor (2006–2008)

Discography 

BSA World Records
 2006 My Tribute
 2007 Anticipation

Crossroads Music / Sonlite Records
 2009 For This Time
 2010 Hit Replay
 2011 The Waiting Is Over
 2012 Our Anthem
 2013 Hit Replay Again

Daywind Records
 2014 Journey Of Hope
 2015 The Thought Of Christmas
 2016 ''Here For You”                                                                
 2017 “Quartet Tribute Vol. 1"
 2019 "Living The Stories"
 2020 "Quartet Tribute Vol. 2"

Awards

References

Gospel quartets
Southern gospel performers